Overseas Pakistanis, or the Pakistani diaspora, refers to Pakistani people who live outside of Pakistan. These include citizens that have migrated to another country as well as people born abroad of Pakistani descent. According to the Ministry of Overseas Pakistanis and Human Resource Development, approximately 8.8 million Pakistanis live abroad according to December 2017 estimates, with the vast majority, over 4.7 million, residing in the Middle East. The second-largest community, at around 1.2 million, live in the United Kingdom; followed in third place by the United States (especially New York City, Chicago, and New Jersey ). According to the UN Department of Economic and Social Affairs, Pakistan has the 6th largest diaspora in the world. In 2021, overseas Pakistanis sent record remittances with growth at 26 percent and levels reaching US$33 billion in 2021.

Terminology 
The term Overseas Pakistani is officially recognised by the Government of Pakistan. The term refers to Pakistani citizens who have not resided in Pakistan for a specified period (for the purpose of income tax) and people born abroad who are of Pakistani descent.

National Identity Card for Overseas Pakistanis 

The National Identity Card for Overseas Pakistanis, or NICOP, is a Computerised National Identity Card issued to workers, emigrants, citizens, or Pakistanis holding dual nationality. NICOP was conceived by NADRA in 2002 as a project of mutual resolve between the Overseas Pakistanis Foundation, the Ministry of Labour & Manpower, and the Ministry of Interior. All NICOP holders are registered into the NADRA database to provide authenticity of the individual and visa-free entry into Pakistan.

Pakistan Origin Card 
The Pakistan Origin Card, or POC, is issued by Pakistani embassies/high commissions to people of Pakistani origin living abroad. POC are not issued to those with dual nationalities.

Emigration from Pakistan
Emigration from the territories that now constitute Pakistan began as early as 3000 BC.

Pre-historic
The presence of Harappan merchants in Mesopotamia from the Indus Valley civilisation is suggested by various forms of glyptic evidence. A recently discovered Mesopotamian cylinder seal inscription reveals that an interpreter from "Meluhha" (Harappa) was present. Several Indus scripted seals have also been discovered in excavations.

Middle ages
During the 10th century, Arabic chronicles mention tribes coming in contact with Baloch settlers. The majority of Baloch settlers originated from the Makran coast and settled in what is today Oman to form part of the Bedoon community. Many of them worked in various trades including barbers, fan operators, and shopkeepers. Some were even drafted as soldiers for the army of the Iman of Oman. A small population of Muslim clergy from Punjab, Kashmir, and Sindh settled in Mecca by the 14th century in order to aid travelers from the region making the journey for Hajj and to also aid in the expansion of Islam throughout the Indus Valley and its tributaries. Bankers and merchants from southern Punjab (Multan) and northern Sindh (Shikarpur) were present in Safavid Persia during the 15th century where they lived along with Jews and Armenians. Pashtun traders arrived by boat in Batticaloa, Sri Lanka, as early as the 15th century. The Mukkuvar locals established an alliance with the Pashtun traders, enlisting their help to fend off incursions from rivals in the north. The traders were rewarded through marriages, and settled in Eravur. Their settlement may have been deliberate, so as to form a buffer against future invasions from the north. When Arab and Persian merchants expanded maritime trade routes in the 16th century, Sindh became fully integrated into the inter-Asian trade network. This led to increased trade and navigational interactions between Sindhi merchants and Arab/Persian merchants. Sindh also entertained independent commercial relations with East Asia and Southeast Asia, in particular with the Kedah Sultanate on the Malay Peninsula.

Colonial era (1842-1947)
After the fall of Sindh in 1842 and Punjab in 1849, a large part of the territory of today's Pakistan came under rule of the British Empire. From 1842 to 1857, a small number of immigrants from Punjab, Sindh, and Kashmir began arriving in the British Isles as employees of the British East India Company, typically as lashkars and sailors in British port cities. After the establishment of the British Empire in 1857, Baloch and Pashtuns along with Punjabis, Sindhis, and Kashmiris continued coming to Britain as seamen, traders, students, domestic workers, cricketers, political officials, and visitors. A small number of them settled in the region. Many influential members of the Pakistan Movement would spend a considerable amount of time in Britain and Europe who studied at major British institutions, including Muhammad Iqbal and Muhammad Ali Jinnah. Between 1860 and 1930 camel caravans worked in Outback Australia which included Pashtun, Punjabi, Baloch, and Sindhi men  as well as others from Kashmir. By 1900, Punjabis and Pashtuns began migrating to other parts of the British Empire. Many were veterans of the British Army, but included a small migrant population who were legally considered British subjects. Pashtun migrants opted for the British Trucial States, where the British used their subjects as a valuable human resource in running the administration. British Columbia became a destination for many Punjabi migrants as agents of the Canadian Pacific Railway and the Hudson's Bay Company were guaranteeing jobs for them between 1902 and 1905. However, many Punjabi migrants returned due to racism and curtailing migration of non-whites by the Canadian government. Others sought opportunities by moving to the United States, particularly Yuba City, California. Poor wages and working conditions convinced Punjabi workers to pool their resources, lease land, and grow their own crops, thereby establishing themselves in the newly budding farming economy of northern California.

Many people from modern Pakistan migrated and settled in Malaysia, which was also part of the British Empire. The Malays and Pakistanis share a strong Muslim identity. At the time of Malaysia's independence under the Federation of Malaya Independence Act 1957, there were more than two-hundred thousand Pakistanis residing in Malaysia. Rather than forming a separate group under the categorized system, at the suggestion of Malays themselves, Pakistanis immersed themselves into the Malay group, thus they became part of the Bumiputra elite, enriched by social ties, intermarriage, and shared economic and political aspirations. They also took positions in the civil service administration and gradually rose to the upper echelons of government, by then inextricably intermixed with the Malay majority. Many elite Malay families have at least one grandparent that was Pakistani. Diplomats, judges, legislators, and other government cadres include people with recognized Pakistani-Malay bloodlines.

Post independence

1947 to 1970

Emigration from Pakistan was relatively small between 1947 and 1970. The rapid industrialization process of Pakistan during the 1950s and 1960s, coupled with the introduction of modern agricultural practices, pushed out surplus labor leading to mass rural to urban migration, primarily to Karachi. During this time period, the majority of Pakistanis who went abroad considered themselves to be "sojourners", who left to earn money abroad but not to settle, or were students who intended to return to Pakistan when their degree programs were completed. By 1971, no more than 900,000 Pakistanis lived abroad with the majority residing in the United Kingdom and Saudi Arabia. In 1959, small numbers of Pakistanis were found to be working in Bahrain, Kuwait, and elsewhere in the Persian Gulf. By 1960, the Pakistani community in Bahrain numbered 2200 while almost half of the population in Kuwait comprised non-nationals, and of them a small number came from Pakistan. Pakistan was already the single most important source of non-Arab expatriate labor in the Kuwait Oil Company (representing about 19% of the workforce) and trailed only Americans among those working for Saudi Aramco in Saudi Arabia, who represented 6% of the workforce.

The first mass migration of Pakistanis began in 1965 during the construction of Mangla Dam in Azad Jammu & Kashmir. Over 280 villages around Mirpur and Dadyal were submerged, which led to the displacement of over 110,000 people from the region. During the same period, the British government were actively seeking people from abroad to work in industrial towns in north-west England who were suffering from worker shortages. Thus many worker permits for Britain were awarded to the displaced population of Mirpur who were eligible for work. Close to 50,000 Pakistanis from Mirpur emigrated to Northern England between 1965 and 1970.

1971 to present

The availability of a large-scale labor force from Pakistan resulted from a combination of economic, social, and institutional factors at home. By 1970, Pakistan was passing through a serious economic and political crisis which eventually led to the secession of East Pakistan in 1971. The rapid economic development of the 1950s and 1960s could not be sustained by 1970 and a wave of nationalization of business and
industry was unfolding under Prime Minister Zulfiqar Ali Bhutto. This led to slower large-scale industrialization due to a new wave of industrial unrest and disaffection between industrialists and Bhutto's government which favored nationalization of banking, large-scale trading, and industry. Rural to urban migration into Karachi slowed down during the 1970s and 80s and was substituted by a rising wave of international migration to Saudi Arabia, Kuwait, or Libya. The profile of the work force and their places of origin simply followed the established patterns of internal migration routes. These included people from NWFP, northern Punjab (Potohar Plateau), the "Seraiki belt" in southern Punjab, and the hill-tracts of Azad Jammu & Kashmir. Institutionally, a network of information chains to seek work, and the channels for remitting money to families back in Pakistan, had already existed. The majority of migrants were young males who would seek work abroad while families would remain back in Pakistan. These channels soon expanded and adapted themselves to new requirements and conditions. During the 1960s and 1970s, the remaining Pakistani Jewish community of 2000 began emigrating to Israel and settled in Ramla.

Today, over 7.6 million Pakistanis live abroad, with an estimated 4 million Pakistanis in the Persian Gulf region. The expatriate labor force in the Persian Gulf has, however, followed what might be called a "circulating work force" pattern. Workers come in, work for a few years during which they periodically visit Pakistan for short or long breaks, and finally return permanently. Since 2004, the Government of Pakistan has recognized the importance of overseas Pakistanis and their contribution to the national economy. Its largest effort is facilitating returning overseas Pakistanis with aims at providing better services through improved facilities at airports and setting up suitable schemes in housing, education, and health care.

Ministry of Overseas Pakistanis and Human Resource Development

The Ministry of Overseas Pakistanis and Human Resource Development is a ministry of the Government of Pakistan that oversees matters concerning Overseas Pakistanis and human resource development in Pakistan. Pir Syed Sadaruddin Shah Rashidi is the current minister. The ministry was created in June 2013, from a merger of the Ministry of Overseas Pakistanis and the Ministry of Human Resource Development. which was established in 2008. The Bureau of Emigration & Overseas Employment appoints Community Welfare Attachés around the world to establish and maintain close contacts with the foreign firms who are in need of manpower for their ventures in different countries, and to aid in the welfare of overseas Pakistanis. CWAs are currently located in:
 Bahrain (Manama)
 Greece, (Athens)
 Italy (Milan)
 Kuwait (Kuwait City)
 Malaysia (Kuala Lumpur)
 Norway (Oslo)
 Oman (Muscat)
 Qatar (Doha) 
 Saudi Arabia (Jeddah, Riyadh)
 Spain (Barcelona)
 United Arab Emirates (Abu Dhabi, Dubai)
 United Kingdom (London, Manchester)
 United States (New York City)
 Germany (Frankfurt)

Overseas Pakistanis Foundation
The Overseas Pakistanis Foundation (OPF) was established July 1979, with its head office at Islamabad and regional offices in all provincial capitals as well as Mirpur, Azad Jammu, and Kashmir. The objective of the OPF is to advance the welfare of the Pakistanis working or settled abroad and their families in Pakistan by identifying their problems and contributing to their solutions. These include health care, financial aid, foreign exchange remittance, and education. The Overseas Pakistanis Foundation operates more than 24 schools in and across Pakistan, offering preschool, primary, secondary, and preparation for local SSC and the international GCE education. Most of its students opt to take the GCE O and AS/A Levels organized by the CIE of UCLES. It also has established international projects in the United Arab Emirates, Saudi Arabia, and the United Kingdom. The head office of the OPF school is located in Islamabad, administering the system through six main regional offices:
 Regional Office Karachi, Sindh (ROK)- Karachi Metropolitan Area and Sindh
 Regional Office Lahore, Punjab (ROL) - Punjab
 Regional Office Multan, Punjab (ROM) - some divisions of Punjab under ROM like Multan, Bahawalpur, Dera Ghazi Khan
 Regional Office Northern Areas, Mirpur (AJK)  - Gilgit-Baltistan, Azad Jammu and Kashmir
 Regional Office Peshawar, Khyber-Pakhtunkhwa (ROP) - Khyber Pakthunkhwa
 Regional Office Quetta,  Balochistan (ROQ) - Balochistan

Relations with Pakistan
Millions of Pakistanis emigrated to various countries during the 1970s and 1980s. Unlike European immigrants who settled permanently in the new world, many Pakistanis who emigrated considered themselves to be "sojourners", who left to earn money abroad but not to settle, or were students who intended to return to Pakistan when their degree programs were completed.

Little Pakistan

Little Pakistan is a general name for an ethnic enclave populated primarily by Pakistanis or people of Pakistani ancestry abroad.

Pakistan International School

Pakistan International Schools are schools based outside Pakistan which promote the national curriculum. These schools fall under the jurisdiction of the Federal Board of Intermediate and Secondary Education and cater mainly to students who are not nationals of the host country such as the children of the staff of international businesses, international organizations, embassies, missions, or missionary programs. For overseas Pakistani families, these schools allow continuity in education from Pakistan as most prefer to stay in the same curriculum, especially for older children. Pakistan international schools typically use curricula based on the Federal Board of Intermediate and Secondary Education and offer both Urdu language and English language classes.

From the Middle East

Since the independence of Pakistan in 1947, there has been a large population of Pakistanis in the Middle East, mainly in Saudi Arabia. However, since the 1990s, many of them have opted for countries like the United Arab Emirates, Bahrain, and Kuwait. Pakistanis who immigrated to these countries or who were born in these countries tended to stay close to Pakistani culture. Many "International Pakistan Schools" were opened to cater to the large population and for them to study under the same boards as Pakistani students at home. As a result, those returning to Pakistan from the Middle East have found it much easier to adjust. Pakistanis from the Middle East can be found throughout the country today and these people are usually fluent in Urdu, English, and their regional language. They are most likely involved in trading, media, telecommunications, banking, and aviation.

From Europe

Since the 1990s, a large number of Pakistanis who settled in Europe have been returning to Pakistan. Those who were born in Europe have also maintained close links to Pakistani culture. However, there are some instances of children not learning Urdu while growing up or being accustomed to Pakistani culture. As a result, those who return from Europe do experience "culture shocks". Those returning from Norway and Denmark are mostly settled around Kharian in the Punjab province, whereas those from northern England (Bradford) can be found in Azad Jammu and Kashmir (mainly Mirpur), Khyber Pakhtunkhwa, and upper Punjab (Jhelum, Chakwal, Attock, and Rawalpindi).

From America

Very small numbers of Pakistanis from Canada and the United States have historically returned to Pakistan. Although they frequently visit Pakistan during the summer and winter vacations, permanent settlement had not been popular amongst them until 2001. Since the September 11 terrorist attacks and the recent Financial crisis of 2007–2010, a large number of Pakistani-Americans and Pakistani-Canadians have begun to return. The population of returning expatriates from the Americas, who tend to have excellent credentials, has increased significantly due to new job opportunities in Pakistan. Many from North America are found in the major cities of Pakistan, mainly, Karachi, Lahore, Rawalpindi/Islamabad, Faisalabad, and Peshawar. Large populations can also be found in smaller cities and towns, such as Sialkot. Those returning from North America have tended to find jobs easier in Pakistan and are involved in a wide scope of fields, primarily healthcare, engineering, law, banking, information technology, mass media, and industry.

Remittances

Population by country 

Population of Pakistanis abroad, by country, according to the 2017-18 Ministry of Overseas Pakistanis and Human Resource Development Yearbook, or other estimates.

See also

Diasporas of Pakistani ethnic groups
 Baloch diaspora
 Kashmiri diaspora
 Hazara diaspora
 Muhajir diaspora
 Pashtun diaspora
 Punjabi diaspora
 Sindhi diaspora
 Saraiki diaspora

Other
 NADRA
 Demographics of Pakistan
 Pakistani students abroad
Little Pakistan

Notes

References

Bibliography 

 Mehmood, Maryyum.  18 May 2021. Mapping Muslim Moral Provinces: Framing Feminized Piety of Pakistani Diaspora. Religions 12: 356; Volume 2 issue 5. https://doi.org/10.3390/rel12050356   MDPI,

External links 
 Ministry of Foreign Affairs, Foreign Affairs Division
 The Asian Population Census report 2010
 Pakistan Cultural Association -Australia
 Pakistani Community Portal in Ireland

P